Nurken Kaldybekuly Mazbayev is a former Kazakhstani football forward. He retired on 20 May 2008, having played 16 seasons and scoring 142 goals in Kazakhstan Premier League, which makes him the second all-time top scorer of the tournament.

Mazbayev made 13 appearances and scored 2 goals for the Kazakhstan national football team from 2000 to 2004. He has managed Taraz.

Career statistics

Club statistics
Last update: 11 June 2008

International goals

Honours

Club
Taraz
 Kazakhstan Super League (1): 1996
Sintez
 Kazakhstan Cup (1): 1999
Zhenis Astana
 Kazakhstan Super League (1): 2000
Kairat
 Kazakhstan Super League (1): 2001
Ordabasy
 Kazakhstan Super League (1): 2004

Individual
 Kazakhstan Top scorer: 1997

References

External links

1972 births
Living people
Association football forwards
Kazakhstani footballers
Kazakhstan international footballers
Kazakhstan Premier League players
FC Kairat players
FC Zhenis Astana players
FC Tobol players
FC Kaisar players
FC Ordabasy players
FC Taraz players
People from Taraz